The 1991 Bhadrak Communal violence was a communal incident which took place on day of Ram Navami in Bhadrak of Odisha on 20 March 1991. The riot happened during the Ram Navami procession while the procession was passing through the Muslim dominated area of Bhadrak town.

Aftermath of the communal violence
This riot gave rises to stone-throwing, looting, and widely arson of public properties. Puruna Bazar and Chandan Bazar area of Bhadrak town were the most affected regions in this communal riot. Md. Abdul Bari played an important role to restore peace and harmony amongst the two communities. He was later awarded the National Harmony Award by Pranab Mukherjee in 2011 for his significant efforts in the aftermath of Bhadrak riots and many other riots in India.

References

1991 in India